Idols South Africa II was the third season of South African reality interactive talent show based on the British talent show Pop Idol. It was aired from June 2003, exactly one year after the first season ended, to October of the same year.
With Colin Moss and Letoya Makhene new hosts were introduced and half of the judging panel was replaced as Mara Louw and Gareth Cliff replaced Penny Lebyane and Marcus Brewster.
The number of finalists was increased to 12 but only two male contestants made it through the semifinal group of the top 32: Jacques Terre'Blanche and Wafeeq Saffodien who both eventually managed to reach the top 5. Originally chosen as a wildcard winner, Francisca Blasisch suddenly quit and was replaced by Khwezi Kekana in the top 12 where she was voted off in the first liveshow.
Due to technical issues the voting was voided in the week of 28 September were the contestants where singing songs by John Lennon and Paul McCartney and nobody was sent home that week.
On 20 October 2003 Anke Pietrangeli, who was nicknamed The Kimberley Diamond by her supporters, won over fellow-finalist Poseletso Sejosingoe in the Gold Reef City Hippodrome Theatre.

Finals

Finalists 
(ages stated at time of contest)

Elimination chart 

Because Francisca quit after she made the finals, Khwezi replaced her
On 29 September there have been issues with counting the lines so the vote was voided that week

Live show details

Heat 1 (20 July 2003) 

Notes
Petro De Villiers and Thelma Jansen advanced to the top 12 of the competition. The other 6 contestants were eliminated.
Granville Williams and Noluthando Meje returned for a second chance at the top 12 in the Wildcard Round.

Heat 2 (27 July 2003) 

Notes
Jacques Terre'Blanche and Karen Ferreira advanced to the top 12 of the competition. The other 6 contestants were eliminated.
Francisca Blasich, Bonolo Thekiso and Khwezi Kekana returned for a second chance at the top 12 in the Wildcard Round.

Heat 3 (3 August 2003) 

Notes
Nazneen Leeman and Poseletso Sejosingoe advanced to the top 12 of the competition. The other 6 contestants were eliminated.
Lwazi Mkhize, Zama Sithole and Andy Milner returned for a second chance at the top 12 in the Wildcard Round.

Heat 4 (10 August 2003) 

Notes
Anke Pietrangeli and Wafeeq Saffodien advanced to the top 12 of the competition. The other 6 contestants were eliminated.
Kgomotso Tsatsi returned for a second chance at the top 12 in the Wildcard Round.

Wildcard round (17 August 2003) 

Notes
The judges selected Kgomotso Tsatsi and Noluthando Meje to move on into the Top 12 of the competition, before the hosts revealed the Top 3 vote getters. Zama Sithole and Francisca Blasich received most votes, and completed the top 12.

Live Show 1 (24 August 2003) 
Theme: Award Winning Songs

Live Show 2 (31 August 2003) 
Theme: Proudly South African

Live Show 3 (7 September 2003) 
Theme: Movie Magic

Live Show 4 (14 September 2003) 
Theme: Big Band

Live Show 5 (21 September 2003) 
Theme: Y2K

Live Show 6 (28 September 2003) 
Theme: My Idol

Live Show 7 (5 October 2003) 
Theme: Lennon & McCartney

Live Show 8: Semi-final (12 October 2003) 
Theme: Viewers' Choice

Live final (19 October 2003)

References

External links 
 Idols II website

Season 2
2003 South African television seasons